Besla insularis is a species of sea snail, a marine gastropod mollusk in the family Pyramidellidae, the pyrams and their allies. The species is one of twelve known species within the Besla genus of gastropods.

Distribution

This marine species has only ever been known to inhabit marine terrain throughout the coasts of New Zealand and other surrounding minor islands.

References

External links
 To World Register of Marine Species

Pyramidellidae
Gastropods described in 1915